Coleophora intermediella is a moth of the family Coleophoridae. It is found in Canada, including Nova Scotia and New Brunswick.

The larvae feed on the seeds of Solidago graminifolia. They create a trivalved, tubular silken case.

References

intermediella
Moths described in 1940
Moths of North America